The Algerian National rugby sevens Championship is a rugby sevens club competition that is played in Algeria and created in 2018. The national championship of rugby began in 2018, it was learned by the president of the Algerian Rugby Federation (FAR), Sofiane Benhacen.

History
The first edition was held in the 2018–19 season. It was won by Stade Oranais. The second one was held two years after in the 2021–22 season and was won by the Etoile Sportive de Bologhine (ES Bologhine).

List of winners

Champions by club

References

External links
National Compétitions - FAR official website

 
Rugby sevens competitions in Algeria
2018 establishments in Algeria
Recurring sporting events established in 2018
Rugby sevens
Sports leagues established in 2018